Highland High School is a high school in Salt Lake City, in the U.S. state of Utah, that opened in 1956 and has a student body of 1,546. It is located at 2166 South 1700 East, next to Sugar House Park, and is part of the Salt Lake City School District. The current principal is Jeremy Chatterton.

Salt Lake School for the Performing Arts
During the 2006–2007 school year, Highland began hosting a school known as the Salt Lake School for the Performing Arts (SPA). It offers programs in music, digital media, theater, tech, and dance, as well as 3500 to 4000 seat auditorium. However, the balcony seats have been made into science labs and rooms. Enrollment is expected to reach its maximum of 400 within thirteen years. Starting in August 2011, SPA classes were held in a separate building, the former Rosslyn Heights elementary school building, with the students being bussed to Highland for their core classes.

Rugby team
Highland High School is noted for its rugby union team. Under coach Larry Gelwix, who started the team in 1976 and continued coaching until retirement in 2011, they compiled a phenomenal 418–10 record. It won the national high school championship in 20 of the 27 years under his reign (beginning with the championship's creation in 1985) and in that time span never placed lower than third, which it has achieved just once. It is also the only team to have participated in every national rugby championship. In 1998, Highland participated in the first World Schools Rugby Championship held in Harare, Zimbabwe. They were the only team from the Western Hemisphere included and placed 3rd out of 12 teams. Many successful football players have passed through this program, including 5-time Pro Bowl defensive lineman Haloti Ngata.

Following Gelwixes' retirement, the team went on hiatus for one year. In the spring of 2013, Mark Numbers, a Highland High School alumnus and former head coach of the University of Utah men's rugby team, became the team's head coach. Different from its former history, the rugby team at Highland now draws its players only from the Highland student body. As youth rugby in the United States continues to shift from national, club‐based competition to state‐based, single‐school competition, Highland Rugby has adopted the single‐school model.

The movie Forever Strong, filmed locally and released in 2008, was based on the accomplishments of the Highland rugby team.

Noted alumni
Marv Bateman – former American football punter for the University of Utah (Utah's only two-time First Team All American), Buffalo Bills – NFL All-Pro in 1976, and Dallas Cowboys 
Stewart Bradley – former NFL outside linebacker for the Denver Broncos, Arizona Cardinals, and Philadelphia Eagles
Peter Breinholt – singer/songwriter
Mark W. Fuller – President and CEO of WET Design
Jon M. Huntsman, Jr. – former Governor of Utah and 2012 Republican presidential candidate
Jason Todd Ipson – writer, producer, director, surgeon; best known for directing the films Unrest and Everybody Wants to be Italian
Jeff Judkins – former NBA player for Boston Celtics, Portland Trail Blazers, Utah Jazz, and Detroit Pistons; current head coach for women's basketball at BYU
David LaFlamme (née Gary Posie) - violinist/songwriter, notably with the band It's a Beautiful Day
Roberto Linck – professional soccer player for Major League Soccer; owner of professional soccer team Miami Dade FC; founder of Ginga Scout
Alexander Magleby – US national rugby team former player, captain, head coach; multiple national and Ivy League championships as head coach of Dartmouth Rugby
Marcus Mailei – former NFL fullback
Bryan Mone – NFL defensive tackle
Steven Sharp Nelson – cellist
Haloti Ngata – former NFL All-Pro defensive tackle
Nate Orchard – NFL defensive end
Morgan Scalley - Defensive Coordinator for Utah Utes Football
Jon Schmidt – New Age pianist and composer
Logan Tom – Olympic indoor volleyball and professional beach volleyball player
Terry Tempest Williams – author best known for Refuge: An Unnatural History of Family and Place.                                    
Fish Smithson - former NFL safety
Bob Nilsen - formerly president of Burger King and, now co-owner of Cafe Rio restaurants.

References

Public high schools in Utah
Schools in Salt Lake City
International Baccalaureate schools in Utah
Educational institutions established in 1956
1956 establishments in Utah